Treehoppers (more precisely typical treehoppers to distinguish them from the Aetalionidae) and thorn bugs are members of the family Membracidae, a group of insects related to the cicadas and the leafhoppers. About 3,200 species of treehoppers in over 400 genera are known. They are found on all continents except Antarctica; only five species are known from Europe. Individual treehoppers usually live for only a few months.

Morphology

Treehoppers, due to their unusual appearance, have long interested naturalists. They are best known for their large pronotum, expanded into often strange shapes that enhance their camouflage or mimicry, often resembling plant thorns (thus the commonly used name of "thorn bugs" for a number of treehopper species). The specialised pronotum (or helmet) may not be simply an expansion of the prothoracic sclerite, but a fused pair of dorsal appendages of the first thoracic segment. The treehopper has specialized muscles in its hind femora that unfurl to generate sufficient force to jump.

These may be serial homologues of insect wings, which are dorsal appendages of the second and/or third thoracic segments, although this interpretation has been seriously challenged. Evidence for this theory included the development of the helmet, which arises as a pair of appendages attached to each side of the dorsal prothorax by an articulation with muscles and a flexible membrane that allow it to be mobile (also, similar genes are involved in development of the helmet and the wings).

Distinguishing males from females is accomplished only by looking at the genitalia.

Ecology
Treehoppers pierce plant stems with their beaks and feed upon sap. The young can frequently be found on herbaceous shrubs and grasses, while the adults more often frequent hardwood tree species. Excess sap becomes concentrated as honeydew, which often attracts ants. Some species have a well-developed ant mutualism, and these species are normally gregarious as well, which attracts more ants. The ants provide protection from predators. Treehoppers mimic thorns to prevent predators from spotting them.

Others have formed mutualisms with wasps, such as Parachartergus apicalis. Even geckos form mutualistic relations with treehoppers, with whom they communicate by small vibrations of the abdomen.

Eggs are laid by the female with her saw-like ovipositor in slits cut into the cambium or live tissue of stems, though some species lay eggs on top of leaves or stems. The eggs may be parasitised by wasps, such as the tiny fairyflies (Mymaridae) and Trichogrammatidae. The females of some membracid species sit over their eggs to protect them from predators and parasites, and may buzz their wings at intruders. The females of some gregarious species work together to protect each other's eggs. In at least one species, Publilia modesta, mothers serve to attract ants when nymphs are too small to produce much honeydew. Some other species make feeding slits for the nymphs.

Like the adults, the nymphs also feed upon sap, and unlike adults, have an extensible anal tube that appears designed to deposit honeydew away from their bodies. The tube appears to be longer in solitary species rarely attended by ants. It is important for sap-feeding bugs to dispose of honeydew, as otherwise it can become infected with sooty moulds. Indeed, one of the evident benefits of ants for Publilia concava nymphs is that the ants remove the honeydew and reduce such fungal growth.

Most species are innocuous to humans, although a few are considered minor pests, such as Umbonia crassicornis (a thorn bug), the three-cornered alfalfa hopper (Spissistilus festinus), and the buffalo treehopper (Stictocephala bisonia), which has been introduced to Europe.  The cowbug Oxyrachis tarandus has been recorded as a pest of Withania somnifera in India.

Systematics
The diversity of treehoppers has been little researched, and their systematic arrangement is tentative. It seems three main lineages can be distinguished; the Endoiastinae are the most ancient treehoppers, still somewhat resembling cicadas. Centrotinae form the second group; they are somewhat more advanced but the pronotum still does not cover the scutellum in almost all of these. The Darninae, Heteronotinae, Membracinae and Smiliinae contain the most apomorphic treehoppers.

Several proposed subfamilies seem to be paraphyletic. Centronodinae and Nicomiinae might need to be merged into the Centrotinae to result in a monophyletic group.

References

Further reading
 Godoy, C., et al. Membrácidos de la América Tropical (Treehoppers of Tropical America(bilingual, English and Spanish).)''. Santo Domingo de Heredia: INBIO, Inst. Nacional de Biodiversidad. 2006.

External links

 
 Dietrich, C. H. Treehopper FAQ. Section for Biodiversity, Illinois Natural History Survey, Champaign, IL, USA. 2006.
 Imagess. Family Membracidae - Treehoppers (United States and Canada). BugGuide.
 DrMetcalf: a resource on cicadas, leafhoppers, planthoppers, spittlebugs, and treehoppers
 Deitz, L. L. and M. S. Wallace. 2010. Treehoppers: Aetalionidae, Melizoderidae, and Membracidae (Hemiptera). North Carolina State University Insect Museum.

 
Membracoidea
Insect vectors of plant pathogens